Universal Religion Chapter 1 is the first compilation album in the Universal Religion compilation series mixed and compiled by Dutch DJ and record producer Armin van Buuren. It was released on 3 November 2003 by Armada Music.

The digital download version was released on 3 November 2003 on iTunes and contains edits of the individual songs listed, as well as the full continuous mix.

Track listing

References

External links
 at Discogs

Armin van Buuren compilation albums
Electronic compilation albums
2003 compilation albums